Todirostrum is a genus of Neotropical birds in the New World flycatcher family Tyrannidae.

Taxonomy and species list
The genus Todirostrum was erected in 1831 by the French naturalist René Lesson. The type species was designated as the common tody-flycatcher by George Robert Gray in 1840. The name combines the genus Todus introduced by Mathurin Jacques Brisson in 1760 with the Latin rostrum meaning "bill".

It contains the following seven species:

References

 
Bird genera
Taxa named by René Lesson
Taxonomy articles created by Polbot